Mesida is a genus of long-jawed orb-weavers that was first described by Władysław Kulczyński in 1911.

Species
 it contains thirteen species and one subspecies, found in Africa, Asia, Papua New Guinea, and Australia:
Mesida argentiopunctata (Rainbow, 1916) – Australia (Queensland)
Mesida culta (O. Pickard-Cambridge, 1869) – India, Sri Lanka
Mesida gemmea (Hasselt, 1882) – Myanmar to Indonesia (Java), Taiwan
Mesida grayi Chrysanthus, 1975 – New Guinea
Mesida humilis Kulczyński, 1911 (type) – New Guinea
Mesida matinika Barrion & Litsinger, 1995 – Philippines
Mesida mindiptanensis Chrysanthus, 1975 – New Guinea
Mesida pumila (Thorell, 1877) – Indonesia (Sumatra) to New Guinea
Mesida realensis Barrion & Litsinger, 1995 – Philippines
Mesida thorelli (Blackwall, 1877) – Seychelles, Mayotte
Mesida t. mauritiana (Simon, 1898) – Mauritius
Mesida wilsoni Chrysanthus, 1975 – New Guinea, Papua New Guinea (Bismarck Arch.)
Mesida yangbi Zhu, Song & Zhang, 2003 – China
Mesida yini Zhu, Song & Zhang, 2003 – China, Laos

See also
 List of Tetragnathidae species

References

Araneomorphae genera
Spiders of Africa
Spiders of Asia
Spiders of Australia
Tetragnathidae